The House of Doctor Dee is a 1993 novel by the English author Peter Ackroyd.

Plot summary
The main character, Matthew Palmer, inherits his father's house in London. Palmer learns that the doctor John Dee, an alchemist who worked for Elizabeth I, used to live in the house. Once he finds out about one of the previous owners, he sets out to find out more about the mysterious alchemist. The second chapter then moves into Dee talking about his life in England during the Renaissance. The novel is a mix of the two men's stories as Palmer continues to find out more about the doctor. As the investigation continues, it is revealed that both men are similar in that they are both selfish and would rather be left to themselves. Several occurrences that happen within the house appear in both time periods. In one instance, Palmer breaks a pigeon's wings by throwing a book of Dee's works at it. Later on, a wing is held in the mouth of Dee's cat. The house is not of one time period, but of multiple dimensions of time.

Dee searches for a way to find gold and create gold with alchemy, but becomes self-centered in the process. Matthew Palmer doesn't care for his father and mother, describing his world as one without love.

Reception
There is a page devoted to the novel in 1001 Books You Must Read Before You Die. The novel is discussed extensively in the books The Heritage of Hermes: Alchemy in Contemporary British Literature and The Golden Egg: Alchemy in Art and Literature in relation to alchemy.

References

External links
Actas del XXI congreso internacional de A.E.D.E.A.N. (English)
Review of the novel and additional links by Linda Proud 

1993 British novels
English science fiction novels
1993 science fiction novels
Postmodern novels
Novels set in London